

Table

References
Footnotes

Citations

 0501
Discovered using the Kepler spacecraft, 0501
 0501